Berninelsonius is a genus of beetles belonging to the family Elateridae.

The species of this genus are found in Europe and Northern America.

Species:
 Berninelsonius hyperboreus (Gyllenhal, 1827)

References

Elateridae
Elateridae genera